Duca can refer to:

People
 (デュッカ), Japanese female singer
 Edoardo Duca (born 1997), Italian footballer
 Ion G. Duca (1879–1933), 35th Prime Minister of Romania
 Lauren Duca (born 1991), American journalist
 Michael Duca (born 1952), American Catholic bishop
 George Ducas (Romanian: Gheorghe Duca; c. 1620–1685), three times prince of Moldavia
 Constantine Ducas (Moldavian ruler) (Romanian: Constantin Duca; died 1704), two times prince of Moldavia

Other
 DUCA Credit Union, a Canadian credit union
 a Romanesque title of duke, notably in Italian

See also
 Del Duca (disambiguation)
 Lo Duca, surname